Baseball at the 1964 Summer Olympics was a demonstration sport and consisted of a single game. It was the fifth time that a baseball exhibition had been held, and was the last time that only one game was played.

Game
The U.S. team of college baseball players—which included eight future Major League Baseball players and was coached by Rod Dedeaux—defeated a Japanese amateur all-star team, 6–2. Approximately 50,000 fans watched the game. The game was played on October 11, 1964, at Meiji Jingu Stadium in Tokyo.

Future major league players on the U.S. team were pitchers Alan Closter, Dick Joyce, and Chuck Dobson; catchers Jim Hibbs and Ken Suarez; outfielder Shaun Fitzmaurice; first baseman Mike Epstein; and second baseman Gary Sutherland. Fitzmaurice hit a home run on the first pitch of the game. Most of the other players on the roster went on to play baseball professionally in the minor leagues.

Prior to the game, players held their own "opening ceremony", as they had not been included in the official opening of the Olympiad, due to baseball's status as a demonstration sport. Additionally, the U.S. baseball team was housed at a YMCA rather than in the Olympic Village. Outside of the Olympics, contemporary news reports note that the U.S. baseball team played a series of exhibition games in Japan and South Korea.

United States roster

Pitchers
 George Bosworth (Hope)
 Bill Brasher (UCLA)
Alan Closter (Iowa State)
Chuck Dobson (Kansas)
Dick Joyce (Holy Cross)
 Walter Peterson (USC)
Keith Weber (Missouri)

Catchers
Jim Hibbs (Stanford)
Bud Hollowell (USC)
Ken Suarez (Florida State)

Infielders
 Tommy Keyes (Mississippi)
 Larry Sandel (USC)
Gary Sutherland (USC)
 Jim Vopicka (Illinois)

Outfielders
Brian Edgerly (Colgate)
Mike Epstein (California)
Shaun Fitzmaurice (Notre Dame)
 Bob Karlblom (Augustana)
 Don Novick (NYU)

Coaches
Rod Dedeaux (USC, head coach)
Dutch Fehring (Stanford, asst.)
Lee Eilbracht (Illinois, asst.)

Source:

Sources

References

Further reading
 

 
1964 Summer Olympics events
1964
1964 in baseball
1964
Olympic demonstration sports